The Doughboy is a sculpture installed in Los Angeles' Pershing Square, in the U.S. state of California.

References

External links

 

Downtown Los Angeles
Military monuments and memorials in the United States
Monuments and memorials in Los Angeles
Outdoor sculptures in Greater Los Angeles
Sculptures of men in California
Statues in Los Angeles